The discography of American rock band White Denim consists of eight studio albums, one live album, four extended plays, two splits, eighteen singles and eight music videos.

Albums

Studio albums

Live albums

Splits

Extended plays

Singles

Music videos

References

External links
 Official website
 White Denim at AllMusic

Rock music group discographies
Discographies of American artists